The 2022 Louisiana Ragin' Cajuns softball team represented the University of Louisiana at Lafayette during the 2022 NCAA Division I softball season. The Ragin' Cajuns played their home games at Yvette Girouard Field at Lamson Park and were led by fifth-year head coach Gerry Glasco. They were members of the Sun Belt Conference.

Preseason

Sun Belt Conference Coaches Poll
The Sun Belt Conference Coaches Poll was released on January 31, 2022. Louisiana was picked to finish first in the conference with 97 votes and 7 first place votes.

Preseason All-Sun Belt team

Olivia Lackie (USA, Pitcher)
Leanna Johnson (TROY, Pitcher)
Kandra Lamb (LA, Pitcher)
Jessica Mullins (TXST, Pitcher)
Kamdyn Kvistad (USA, Catcher)
Sophie Piskos (LA, Catcher)
Faith Shirley (GASO, 1st Base)
Kelly Horne (TROY, 2nd Base)
Daisy Hess (GSU, Shortstop)
Sara Vanderford (TXST, 3rd Base)
Iyanla De Jesus (CCU, Designated Player)
Raina O'Neal (LA, Outfielder)
Mackenzie Brasher (USA, Outfielder)
Emily Brown (GSU, Outfielder)
Jade Sinness (TROY, Outfielder)

National Softball Signing Day

Personnel

Schedule and results

Schedule Source:
*Rankings are based on the team's current ranking in the NFCA/USA Softball poll.

Clemson Regional

Rankings

References

Louisiana
Louisiana Ragin' Cajuns softball seasons
Louisiana Ragin' Cajuns softball
Louisiana